Dangerous Drugs Act may refer to:

 Dangerous Drugs Act 1920, a United Kingdom law
 Dangerous Drugs Act 1952, a Malaysian law